The Lung Tsun Stone Bridge was a bridge in British Hong Kong which was buried during the construction of Kai Tak Airport and which connected the Kowloon Walled City to a pier leading into Kowloon Bay.

History

In middle of the nineteenth century, European merchants used Chinese junks to smuggle goods and opium to the mainland. The Viceroy of Liangguang ordered a checkpoint to be set up in the water channel between Hong Kong and Macau. Due to the replenishment need for the customs ships, the stone bridge was proposed to be built and named after a nearby river, known as the Lung Tsun River.

Gambling was allowed in Hong Kong between 1867 and 1871 but was prohibited in 1872. The casinos moved to the Kowloon Walled City. As a nearby pier, in particular, the Lung Tsun Stone Bridge become a hotspot for many of the foreign gamblers arriving in Hong Kong.

Construction on the bridge began in 1873 and was completed in 1875. At the time, it was the longest and toughest stone pier in Hong Kong. It was divided into the south and the north. During the Japanese occupation of Hong Kong in WWII, the bridge was completely covered up when the nearby Kai Tak Airport was expanded.

Conservation
The bridge's remnants were first identified in April 2008. Remnants of the bridge will be preserved in-situ as part of the redevelopment plan for the Kai Tak site.

References

Further reading
 Antiquities and Monuments Office, "Discovery of Longjin Bridge in Kai Tak Area", Board Paper AAB/60/2007-08, June 2008

External links

 "Major archaeological features identified at the Site by 2008-09 archaeological investigations with levels of significance"

Kowloon City District
Bridges in Hong Kong
Piers in Hong Kong
Bridges completed in 1875